Caucasian Albanian is a Unicode block containing characters used by the Caucasian Albanian peoples of Azerbaijan and Dagestan for writing Northeast Caucasian languages.

History
The following Unicode-related documents record the purpose and process of defining specific characters in the Caucasian Albanian block:

References 

Unicode blocks
Northeast Caucasian languages